Li Zhao (3 February 1940 – 24 January 2023) was a Chinese engineer in the fields of mine blasting, and an academician of the Chinese Academy of Engineering.

He was a representative of the 13th National Congress of the Chinese Communist Party.

Biography
Li was born in Wuji County, Hebei, on 3 February 1940, to Li Guanying, a textile expert, and Xue Hua, a housewife.

After university in 1964, Li was despatched to the People's Liberation Army General Armaments Department, where he was promoted to major general (shaojiang) in 1994.

On 24 January 2023, he died at the age of 82.

Honours and awards
 1985 State Science and Technology Progress Award (First Class)
 1999 Member of the Chinese Academy of Engineering (CAE)

References

1940 births
2023 deaths
People from Shijiazhuang
Engineers from Hebei
National University of Defense Technology alumni
Members of the Chinese Academy of Engineering
20th-century Chinese engineers
21st-century Chinese engineers